Joy of Sex (sometimes referred to as National Lampoon's Joy of Sex) is a 1984 American sex comedy film directed by Martha Coolidge. It was written by Kathleen Rowell and J.J. Salter, based on the sex manual by Alex Comfort.

Plot 
Leslie Hindenberg has just entered her senior year of high school. She visits her doctor to have a mole examined, but she mistakenly comes to believe she only has six weeks to live and goes about trying to lose her virginity. However it is difficult for her to accomplish her goal when her father is the school's phys ed coach. Meanwhile, Alan Holt is a teenager whose pals brag about their sexual encounters. He is rather frustrated as he cannot stop thinking about sex and attempts to lose his virginity any way possible.

Cast

Production 
Paramount Pictures paid a great amount of money to secure the rights to Alex Comfort’s sex manual  just so they could use the title, which they found to be highly commercial.

In 1978 they hired Charles Grodin to write a script, telling him the movie "could be about anything". Grodin decided to use this exact situation as the premise: a Hollywood writer struggles to write a script based on a sex manual after a big studio acquires the rights. When he finished his first draft, Paramount passed. Grodin finally managed to get his screenplay green lit by MGM in 1985 as Movers & Shakers. In that movie, the sex manual is now called "Joy in Sex".

According to the book Wired, John Belushi was supposed to appear in this movie, but he died before filming began. In her biography My Mother Was Nuts, Penny Marshall states she was slated to direct (this would have been her first feature film) from a script by John Hughes (which would have been his first script to be adapted for film). This version of the screenplay consisted of several unrelated vignettes. The producers wanted to have Belushi wearing diapers on the poster, even though no such scene appeared in Hughes' screenplay.

Martha Coolidge was fired from the movie, for cutting many scenes of gratuitous nudity, but declined an opportunity to have her directing credit appear as Alan Smithee. National Lampoon producer Matty Simmons claims to have paid $250,000 to remove the National Lampoon name from the project, saying, "It may have nothing to do with the quality of the picture. We simply don’t like to take credit or responsibility for a picture that we have nothing to do with.”

"The National Lampoon's possible disassociation surfaced in a March newsletter to company shareholders, publicized this week by Daily Variety. National Lampoon Inc. Chairman Matty Simmons said in a phone interview Wednesday that the move "may have nothing to do with (the quality of the picture). We simply don't like to take credit or responsibility for a picture that we have nothing to do with." Simmons is officially titled as executive producer of "Joy of Sex" But his active participation ended when the original "Joy of Sex" project including screenwriter John Hughes ("National Lampoon's Vacation") and director Bill Norton collapsed."

Release 
The film was given a theatrical release in the United States by Paramount Pictures in August 1984. It grossed $4,463,841 at the box office.

The film was given a release on VHS by Paramount Home Video in the 1980s. To date, the film has still not been officially released on DVD.

Eleanor Mannikka of All Movie Guide has nothing but disdain for the movie:

Producer of The Joy Of Sex, Frank Konigsberg: 
"Paramount was running out on their option on Alex Comfort's book. They had four months to start principle photography. They came to me and asked me to do it. They knew that in television you do things quickly. We threw together a script. They wanted me to use director Martha Coolidge, who'd just made Valley Girls (sic). It was a job. We just had to get it done. I didn't think it was a successful movie at all. It was awful. Martha hated it. I hated it."

Director of The Joy Of Sex, Martha Coolidge: 
"Paramount insisted on topless girls running down the hall because they thought the formula demanded it and it was totally gratuitous. I hated putting them in for no reason and argued against it. But when the film was previewed the audience, particularly young women and girls, hated the nudity so Paramount then asked me to cut as much of it out as I could! They had thought they were going to get a Porky's but the script was more from a girl's point of view (as was Valley Girl). It was actually a romance and certainly the women writers and I weren't the people to get a Porky's from. The movie wasn't what the execs thought it would be, they freaked, took me off the movie, cut it down and tried to make the humor broader which made it more disjointed.  The entire budget was minuscule and the music was given only $20,000! For comparison the Valley Girl sound track (not including score) cost $150,000. The whole 'Joy of Sex' experience was pretty miserable. We were under constant pressure and scrutiny to do the impossible, we had eight days of prep, 20 days to shoot and my A.D. quit because he was so angry. I learned that I can't always save the day or be a hero and you have to protect yourself at all times. I did find some very talented actors though!"“Back to the 80s: Interview with director Martha Coolidge.” via: OfficialMarthaCoolidge.com

"It’s a wrenching decision", explains Martha Coolidge, who considered taking her name off of 1984’s “Joy of Sex” after the studio reworked her version, "but it’s made when the director finds himself or herself answering yes to these questions: Will the film “embarrass me, humiliate me, disgust me for the rest of my life?”"

Notes 
 Scott, Vernon. “Telling Dad About Nude Scene Tough Role for Actress to Play. The Pittsburgh Press. United Press International. August 24, 1983.
 Thomas, Bob. “Lampoon to Spoof Hollywood on Film.” Associated Press. Star-News. Mar 1, 1981.
 Thomas, Bob. “Director Insists Joy of Sex not a raunchy skin comedy.” Associated Press. The Post and The Evening Times. Associated Press. Aug 3, 1984 (reprinted from July 1983).
 Uricchio, Marylynn. “Joy of Sex movie is unhappily terrible. Pittsburgh Post-Gazette. August 4, 1984.
 Wolf, William. “New York Calling.” Asbury Park Press. May 8, 1983.

References

External links 
 
 
 
  
 
 
 
 
 

1984 films
1980s sex comedy films
1980s teen comedy films
American coming-of-age comedy films
1980s English-language films
National Lampoon films
Paramount Pictures films
American sex comedy films
Films about virginity
American teen comedy films
Films directed by Martha Coolidge
Teen sex comedy films
Teensploitation
1984 comedy films
1980s American films